Angus John Bateman (1919–1996) was an English geneticist. He is most notable for his 1948 study of sexual selection in fruit flies (Drosophila melanogaster) which established Bateman's principle.

Bateman was a member of the Communist Party of Great Britain during the Lysenko affair. He was an anti-Lysenkoist within the Party whilst writing in defense of Lysenko for non-Party audiences.

Career
Bateman received his B.Sc  from King's College London in 1940, and later received his Ph.D. and D.Sc. from the same institution. In 1942 he moved to Cyril Darlington's Genetics Department at  the John Innes Horticultural Institute in Merton Park. Bateman was an acquaintance of Ronald Fisher and critically discussed the manuscript of his 1948 paper with him.

Bateman later moved to the Paterson Institute in Manchester and worked on mutagenicity.

References

English geneticists
Alumni of King's College London
1919 births
1996 deaths